Sorceress is the twelfth studio album by the Swedish progressive rock band Opeth. The album was released on 30 September 2016 via record label Nuclear Blast and the band's own imprint Moderbolaget. The album was produced and mixed by Tom Dalgety and recorded at Rockfield Studios in Wales. Following the album's release, the band embarked on a world tour with bands the Sword, Sahg, and Myrkur as supporting acts. Thematically, the album draws inspiration from Åkerfeldt's personal life, as he divorced in 2016. The album was streamed via SoundCloud on 29 September.

Track listing

Personnel

Opeth
Mikael Åkerfeldt – vocals, electric and acoustic guitars, production
Fredrik Åkesson – electric and acoustic guitars, backing vocals
Joakim Svalberg – Hammond C3 organ, Mellotron, Fender Rhodes 88, harpsichord, grand piano, Moog, percussion, backing vocals
Martín Méndez – bass guitars
Martin Axenrot – drums, percussion

Additional personnel
Pascale Marie Vickery - spoken words on "Persephone" and "Persephone (Slight Return)"
Wil Malone – string arrangements
Tom Dalgety – engineering, mixing, production
John Davis – mastering
Travis Smith – cover art

Charts

References

2016 albums
Opeth albums
Nuclear Blast albums
Albums produced by Tom Dalgety
Albums recorded at Rockfield Studios